The Pan-African Congress of Mathematicians (PACOM)  is an international congress of  mathematics, held under the auspices of the African Mathematical Union.

List of congresses 

 2008 –
 2004 – Tunis, Tunisia
 2000 – Cape Town, South Africa
 1995 – Ifrane, Morocco
 1991 – Nairobi, Kenya
 1986 – Jos, Nigeria
 1976 – Rabat, Morocco

External links
 7th PACOM 2008

Recurring events established in 1976
Mathematics conferences